62 Aquilae is a single star located about 427 light years away from the Sun in the equatorial constellation of Aquila. 62 Aquilae is its Flamsteed designation. It is visible to the naked eye as a dim, orange-hued star with an apparent visual magnitude of 5.67.

This is an aging giant star with a stellar classification of K4 III, having exhausted the supply of hydrogen at its core and expanded to 23 times the girth of the Sun. It is 11.2 billion years old with 0.89 times the Sun's mass. The star is radiating 153 times the luminosity of the Sun from its swollen photosphere at an effective temperature of 4,246 K.

References

K-type giants
Aquila (constellation)
Durchmusterung objects
Aquilae, 62
190299
098844
7667